Rázuri District is one of eight districts of the province Ascope in Peru.

See also
Chicama Valley
Puerto Chicama

References